Bắc Hà is a rural district of Lào Cai province in the Northeast region of Vietnam. It is the capital of the region of the Flower Hmong, one of the 54 minorities of Vietnam and one of the six groups of Hmong people. The town is enjoying an economic boom thanks to tourism, centered on the markets and, more and more, excellent trekking in the mountains north of the town.

Bắc Hà was the location at which the adventure sport competition "Raid Gauloises" was held in 2002. Bắc Hà is also famous for its Tam Hoa plums; the flowers of the tree must bloom three times before the fruits are ripe. As of 2003, the district had a population of 48,988. The district capital lies at Bắc Hà.

Administrative divisions
Bắc Hà (district capital), Bản Phố, Bản Liền, Bản Già, Bảo Nhai, Bản Cái, Cốc Ly, Cốc Lầu, Nậm Mòn, Nậm Khánh, Nậm Đét, Na Hối, Lầu Thí Ngài, Lùng Phìn, Lùng Cải, Tả Củ Tỷ, Tả Van Chư, Tà Chải, Thải Giàng Phố, Hoàng Thu Phố and Nậm Lúc.

References

Districts of Lào Cai province
Hmong
Lào Cai province